Nationality words link to articles with information on the nation's poetry or literature (for instance, Irish or France).

Events

Works published
 Alexander Barclay, Saint George, translated from Baptista Spagnuoli Mantuanus; Great Britain
 Stephen Hawes,  publication year uncertain; Great Britain
 John of Capistrano, Capystranus, London

Births
Death years link to the corresponding "[year] in poetry" article:
 March 28 - Teresa of Ávila, mystical Spanish poet and saint
 Roger Ascham, born about this year (died 1568), English scholar,  didactic writer and poet; tutor of Queen Elizabeth I
 William Baldwin, born about this year (died 1563), English
 Nicolas Denisot (died 1559), French Renaissance poet and painter 
 Brne Karnarutić (died 1573), Croatian Renaissance poet and writer
 Ambrosius Lobwasser (died 1585), German poet and hymnologist
 Louis Des Masures (died 1574), French

Deaths
Birth years link to the corresponding "[year] in poetry" article:
 February 16 - Aldus Manutius (born 1449), Italian printer and Latin-language poet
 Cantalicio (born 1445), Italian, Latin-language poet

See also

 Poetry
 16th century in poetry
 16th century in literature
 French Renaissance literature
 Grands Rhétoriqueurs
 Renaissance literature
 Spanish Renaissance literature

Notes

16th-century poetry
Poetry